Serge Benoit de Robillard Bouchet (born September 7, 1973, in Curepipe, Mauritius) was the first Mauritian athlete to gain international recognition in the sport of windsurfing for sailing between Mauritius and Réunion Island unassisted.

Career
At a young age, Benoit took up the sport of windsurfing under the watchful guidance of his experienced father, Serge de Robillard Bouchet. At the age of 21, Benoit set out to break the record for windsurfing between the two islands with the full support of his family.

On September 11, 1994, Benoit left the Mauritian shore at Morne Brabant, at 6.15am. His board of choice was the "Fanatic Mega Cat". Later that day, he landed on the shore of Reunion Island, Point De Cascade, Ste. Rose at 1.44pm. During his journey, he was carefully followed by a boat carrying his friends and family along with the local media crew.

He was awarded a medal of sportsmanship for the month of September 1994 by the Mauritian Minister of Sports, Michael Glover, in January 1995.

References 

1973 births
Mauritian windsurfers
Living people
Mauritian people of French descent
People from Plaines Wilhems District